Najwa Nimri Urrutikoetxea (born 14 February 1972) is a Spanish actress and singer.

Early life
Nimri's mother is from Pamplona and her father, Karam Nimri, is Jordanian. She has a brother named Karim Nimri, a half-brother named Andre Nimri and two half-sisters named Sara and Nadia Nimri. Najwa also has a cousin who is a singer named  Alexander Nimier. When she was a child she moved to Bilbao and now lives in Madrid.

Career
Her first major film role was in Salto al vacío, the first movie by film director Daniel Calparsoro. Her career as a singer started with small groups. In 1996, she formed the band Najwajean with Carlos Jean. She has also released three solo albums. She was married to Daniel Calparsoro.

Several of her film roles won her praise: as Ana in Lovers of the Arctic Circle, and as Elena in Lucía y el sexo. Both films were directed by Julio Medem. She starred next to Eduardo Noriega in Abre los ojos, and El método.

She was nominated to the 33rd edition of Goya Awards for Goya Award for Best Actress for Quién te cantará.

In 2020, she returned as Zulema in the spin off Vis a vis: El Oasis, starring with Maggie Civantos. She played Alicia Sierra, a policewoman inspector in (Money Heist) La casa de papel. She voiced Kate Laswell in the 2019 video game Call of Duty: Modern Warfare.

Discography

With Carlos Jean as Najwajean
 No Blood (1998) – No. 80
 Asfalto (2001) (soundtrack) – No. 175
 Guerreros (2002) (soundtrack) – No. 88
 Najwajean Selection (2002) (compilation album) – No. 108
 Till It Breaks (2008) – No. 20
 Bonzo (2015)

Najwajean singles
 I'm gonna be (1999)
 Garota de Ipanema (1999)
 Crime (2008)
 Waiting (2015)
 Bonzo (2015)
 Drive me (2016)

Solo albums
 Carefully (2001) – No. 76
 Mayday (2003) – No. 48
 Walkabout (2006) – No. 10 (50,000 copies sold; Gold)
 Donde rugen los volcanes (2012)
 Rat Race (2014)
 Viene de Largo (2020)
 AMA  (2021)

Solo singles
 That Cyclone   (2001) from Carefully – No. 37
 Following Dolphins   (2001) from Carefully – No. 68
 Go Cain   (2003) from Mayday – No. 20
 Hey Boys, Girls   (2003) from Mayday – No. 26
 Capable   (2006) from Walkabout – No. 3
 Push It   (2006) from Walkabout
 Le Tien, Le Mien (2006) from Walkabout
 El último primate (2010) from El Ultimo primate
 Como un animal (2010) from El ultimo primate.
 Donde rugen los volcanes" (2012) from Donde rugen los volcanes
 Somos su nuevo invitado (2012) from Donde rugen los volcanes
 Feed Us (2014) from Rat Race
 Rat race (2014) from Rat Race
 Pijama (2014) from Rat Race
 Lento (2020) from Viene de largo
  Panpan (2020)
 Mira Como Van (2020)
 Santa Claus llego a la cuidad (2020)
 Contra Quien Luchaba (2022)
 Aperol (2022)
 Esquiando (2023)
 Big Bang'' (2023)

Filmography

Films

Television

Podcast

Accolades

References

External links

 
 Najwa Nimri's website (in Spanish)

1972 births
Living people
Spanish film actresses
English-language singers from Spain
French-language singers
Spanish people of Jordanian descent
People from Bilbao
Actresses from Navarre
Singers from Navarre
20th-century Spanish singers
21st-century Spanish singers
20th-century Spanish women singers
21st-century Spanish women singers
Spanish television actresses
20th-century Spanish actresses
21st-century Spanish actresses
Video game actresses